Rylsky District is an administrative and municipal district (raion), one of the twenty-eight in Kursk Oblast, Russia. It is located in the west of the oblast. Its administrative center is the town of Rylsk. Population:  40,714 (2002 Census);  The population of Rylsk accounts for 50.5% of the district's total population.

Attractions
In the environs of Rylsk, two manors are of interest to the student of Russian history.

References

Notes

Sources

Districts of Kursk Oblast
